This is a list of Icelandic brands, which encompasses brand-name products and services produced by companies in Iceland.

Icelandic brands

 365 (media corporation)
 66°NORTH
 Icelandair
 AURUM By Guðbjörg - Iceland's leading jewellery brand, est. 1999
 CCP Games
 Egill Skallagrímsson Brewery
 FRISK Software International
 Icelandair Group – the largest corporation in Iceland, with 125 billion ISK in revenue in 2013
 Icewear
 Íslandsbanki
 Marel
 Metro
 Nói Síríus
 Össur
 Reyka
 Síminn
 Sláturfélag Suðurlands
 Tulipop
 WOW air – Second largest airline in Iceland, declared bankrupt in 2019
 Eimskip 
 Kjarnafæði - Meat production company based in northern part of Iceland
 Norðlenska - Meat production company based in northern part of Iceland
 BYKO
 Húsasmiðjan

See also

 Economy of Iceland
 List of companies of Iceland
 List of restaurants in Iceland

References

 
Icelandic brands
Brands